The women's 4×100 m freestyle relay at the 2009 World Aquatics Championships took place on July 26, 2009 at the Foro Italico in Rome, Italy.

Records

The existing records when the event started were:

The following records were established during the competition:

Results

Heats

Final

External links
Preliminary Results
Final Results

Relay Women's Freestyle 4x100 m
2009 in women's swimming